Versification may be
the art of making verses, see poetry
the theory of the phonetic structure of verse, see metre (poetry)
the rendition of a prose work into verse, especially of classical works during the Middle Ages, see medieval poetry
the subdivision of the books of the Bible into "verses", see Versification (Bible)

See also
versifier (contemptuously of mediocre poets)
Versificator (disambiguation)